Ronactolol is a beta adrenergic receptor antagonist.

References

Beta blockers
Benzamides
Isopropylamino compounds
Secondary amines
Secondary alcohols
Phenol ethers
Anilides